Zamira Khamatkhanovna Zaytseva (born February 16, 1953) is a retired middle-distance runner who represented the USSR. She was born in Oltinkoʻl, Uzbek SSR.

Her achievements include three championship silver medals over 1500 metres.

Her personal best times are 1:56.21 (800 metres) and 3:56.14 (1500 metres).

International competitions

References
 

1953 births
Living people
People from Andijan Region
Uzbekistani female middle-distance runners
Soviet female middle-distance runners
World Athletics Championships athletes for the Soviet Union
World Athletics Championships medalists
European Athletics Championships medalists